Phylicia Rashad (née Ayers-Allen; born June 19, 1948) is an American actress, singer, and director. She is dean of the College of Fine Arts at Howard University and best known for her role as Clair Huxtable on the sitcom The Cosby Show (1984–1992) which earned her Emmy Award nominations in 1985 and 1986. She also played Ruth Lucas on Cosby (1996–2000). She was dubbed "The Mother of the Black Community" at the 2010 NAACP Image Awards.

In 2004, Rashad became the first black actress to win the Tony Award for Best Actress in a Play, which she won for her role in the revival of A Raisin in the Sun. In 2022, Rashad won her second Tony Award for Best Featured Actress in a Play for her performance in Dominique Morisseau's Skeleton Crew. Her other Broadway credits include Into the Woods (1988), Jelly's Last Jam (1993), Gem of the Ocean (2004), and Cat on a Hot Tin Roof (2008).  Rashad won a NAACP Image Award when she reprised her A Raisin in the Sun role in the 2008 television adaptation.

She has appeared in the films For Colored Girls (2010), Good Deeds (2012), Creed (2015), and Creed II (2018). She also voiced Brenda Glover on the Nick Jr. animated children's educational television series Little Bill (1999–2004). In the 21st century, she has directed revivals of three plays by August Wilson, in major theaters in Seattle, Princeton, New Jersey; and Los Angeles.

Early life
Phylicia Ayers-Allen was born on June 19, 1948, in Houston, Texas. Her mother, Vivian Ayers, is a Pulitzer Prize-nominated artist, poet, playwright, scholar, and publisher. Her father, Andrew Arthur Allen, was an orthodontist. Her siblings are brother Tex (Andrew Arthur Allen Jr.), a jazz-musician; sister Debbie Allen, an actress, choreographer, and director; and brother Hugh Allen, now a real estate banker in Charlotte, North Carolina. Their parents divorced when Phylicia was six.

Several years later, her mother moved with the two sisters to Mexico, to evade United States segregation.

Ayers-Allen later studied at Howard University, graduating magna cum laude in 1970 with a Bachelor of Fine Arts degree. While there, she was initiated into the Alpha Chapter of Alpha Kappa Alpha sorority.

Career

Theatre
Ayers-Allen first became known for her stage work with a string of Broadway credits, including Deena Jones in Dreamgirls (she also was Sheryl Lee Ralph's understudy until leaving the show in 1982, after being passed over as Ralph's full-time replacement). She played a Munchkin in The Wiz for three and a half years. In 1978, she released the album Josephine Superstar, a disco concept album telling the life story of Josephine Baker. The album was mainly written and produced by Jacques Morali and Victor Willis, Rashad's second husband and the original lead singer and lyricist of the Village People. She met Willis while they were both cast in The Wiz.

Other Broadway credits include August: Osage County, Cat on a Hot Tin Roof, Gem of the Ocean, Raisin in the Sun (2004 Tony Award for Best Actress in a Play/Drama Desk Award), Blue, Jelly's Last Jam, Into the Woods, and Ain't Supposed to Die a Natural Death. Off-Broadway credits include Lincoln Center's productions of Cymbeline and Bernarda Alba; Helen, The Story and Everybody's Ruby at the Public Theater; The Negro Ensemble Company productions of Puppet Play, Zooman and the Sign, Sons and Fathers of Sons, In an Upstate Motel, Weep Not For Me, and The Great Mac Daddy; Lincoln Center's production of Ed Bullins' The Duplex; and The Sirens at the Manhattan Theatre Club. In regional theatre, she performed as Euripides' Medea and in Blues for an Alabama Sky at the Alliance Theatre in Atlanta, Georgia. Other regional theatres at which she has performed are the Arena Stage in Washington, D.C. and the Huntington Theatre in Boston.

In the early 21st century, Rashad was the first black actress of any nationality to win the Best Actress (Play) Tony Award, for her 2004 performance as Lena Younger in a revival of the play A Raisin in the Sun by Lorraine Hansberry. Rashad also won the 2004 Drama Desk award for Best Actress in a Play for A Raisin in the Sun, tying (split award that year) with Viola Davis for the play Intimate Apparel. Rashad was nominated again for a Tony the following year, for her performance in Gem of the Ocean.

In 2007, Rashad made her directorial debut with the Seattle Repertory Theatre's production of August Wilson’s Gem of the Ocean.

In 2008, Rashad starred on Broadway as Big Mama in an all African-American production of Tennessee Williams's Pulitzer Prize-winning drama Cat on a Hot Tin Roof, directed by her sister Debbie Allen. She appeared alongside stage veterans James Earl Jones (Big Daddy) and Anika Noni Rose (Maggie), as well as film actor Terrence Howard, who made his Broadway debut as Brick. In 2009, she appeared as Violet Weston, the drug-addicted matriarch of Tracy Letts's award-winning play August: Osage County, at the Music Box Theatre.

Rashad returned to directing August Wilson's work in early 2014, when she led a revival of Wilson's Fences, at the McCarter Theatre in Princeton, New Jersey. It received generally positive reviews. She continued to focus on Wilson's work, including a well-received production of Ma Rainey's Black Bottom, which she directed at the Mark Taper Forum in Los Angeles in late 2016.

From March 17 to May 1, 2016, Rashad played the lead role of Shelah in Tarell Alvin McCraney's play Head of Passes at The Public Theater. Her performance was positively reviewed.

Film and television
Rashad joined the cast of the ABC soap opera One Life to Live to play publicist Courtney Wright in 1983. She is best known for the role of attorney Clair Huxtable on the NBC sitcom The Cosby Show. The show, which ran from 1984 to 1992, starred Bill Cosby as obstetrician Heathcliff "Cliff" Huxtable, and focused on their life with their five children. In 1985, Rashad co-hosted the NBC telecast of the Macy's Thanksgiving Day Parade with Pat Sajak and Bert Convy.

When Cosby returned to TV comedy in 1996 with CBS's Cosby, he called Rashad to play Ruth Lucas, his character's wife. The pilot episode had been shot with Telma Hopkins, but Cosby fired the executive producer and replaced Hopkins with Rashad. The sitcom ran from 1996 to 2000. That year, Cosby also asked Rashad to work on his animated television series Little Bill, in which the actress voiced Bill's mother, Brenda, until the show's end in 2004. She also played a role in the pre-show of the Dinosaur ride at Walt Disney World's Animal Kingdom theme park as Dr. Helen Marsh, the head of the Dino Institute.

Rashad played "Kill Moves"' wealthy mother on Everybody Hates Chris on December 9, 2007. In 2007 she appeared as Winnie Guster in the Psych episode "Gus's Dad May Have Killed an Old Guy". She returned to the role in 2008, in the episode "Christmas Joy".

In February 2008, Rashad portrayed Lena Younger in the television film adaptation of A Raisin in the Sun, directed by Kenny Leon. It starred core members of the cast of the 2004 Broadway revival at the Royale Theatre of Lorraine Hansberry's 1959 play, including Audra McDonald as Ruth Younger, and Sean Combs as Walter Lee Younger. The television film adaption debuted at the 2008 Sundance Film Festival and was broadcast by ABC on February 25, 2008. According to Nielsen Media Research, the program was watched by 12.7 million viewers and ranked #9 in the ratings for the week ending March 2, 2008.

In November 2010, Rashad featured as Gilda in the ensemble cast in the Tyler Perry film For Colored Girls, based on the play For Colored Girls Who Have Considered Suicide When the Rainbow Is Enuf by Ntozake Shange.

Rashad said about this work in an interview with Vibe Movies & TV in 2010:
"I saw the original Broadway play. I thought it was amazing how such a story that wasn’t pretty was poetry. Usually poetry is about lofty things and this was the poetry of speech and the movement of everyday people. I found a little bit of it off-putting to tell you the truth, because it was so angry when I saw it. And I think Tyler Perry has added an element here that wasn't in the original stage production, and that is the necessity for taking responsibility for one's own self otherwise you are just living to die. That is where he wrote the line [in the film], 'You gotta take some responsibility in this. Otherwise you are just living to die.'"

In 2012, she starred in another Tyler Perry film, Good Deeds. Also in 2012, Rashad played Clairee Belcher in the remake of Steel Magnolias (the role originated by Olympia Dukakis). This version has an all African American A-list cast, including Queen Latifah as M'Lynn, Jill Scott as Truvy, Condola Rashād as Shelby, Adepero Oduye as Annelle, and Alfre Woodard as Ouiser.

In 2016, Rashad was cast as a recurring guest star in the role of Diana DuBois in the third season of the Lee Daniels-produced Empire television series on Fox.

In 2017, Rashad portrayed Bishop Yvette A. Flunder, pastor of The City of Refuge Church in San Francisco, Calif., as part of the Dustin Lance Black mini-series When We Rise.  Her appearance in the show highlighted the reputed compassion of the church, the commitment of its leadership, and the loving home the church provides to minister in the tough, primarily African-American community in San Francisco.

In 2020, Rashad provided the voice of Libba Gardner, Joe Gardner's mother, in Pixar's Soul.

Academia 
In May 2021, Rashad was appointed as dean of Howard University's Chadwick A. Boseman College of Fine Arts. In June 2021, her comments supporting the release of former co-star Bill Cosby from prison were criticized. Some called for Howard University to revoke her appointment, and Howard University stated that "Personal positions of University leadership do not reflect Howard University's policies." Rashad later apologized in an email to Howard University students and their parents.

Personal life
Rashad's first marriage, in 1972, was to dentist William Lancelot Bowles, Jr. They had one son, William Lancelot Bowles III, who was born the following year. The marriage ended in 1975. Rashad married Victor Willis (original lead singer of the Village People) in 1978; they had met during the run of The Wiz. They divorced in 1982.

She married a third time, to Ahmad Rashad on December 14, 1985. He was a former NFL wide receiver and sportscaster. It was a third marriage for each of them, and she took his last name. He proposed to her during a pregame show for a nationally televised Thanksgiving Day football game between the New York Jets and the Detroit Lions on November 28, 1985. Their daughter, Condola Phylea Rashād, was born on December 11, 1986, in New York. The couple divorced in early 2001, and she has retained the surname Rashad.

Rashad faced widespread criticism after she posted the following tweet in support of Bill Cosby after he was released from jail on a technicality: "FINALLY!!!! A terrible wrong is being righted- a miscarriage of justice is corrected!" This support was characterized as rape apologism.

Rashad is a vegetarian.

Filmography

Film

Television

Awards and honors

2003: Honored as Woman of the Year by the Harvard Black Men's Forum
2005: received an honorary Doctor of Fine Arts (D.F.A.) degree from Brown University
2011: received an honorary doctorate degree from Spelman College for her work in the Arts
2011: named the first Denzel Washington Chair professor in Theatre at Fordham University, supported by a $2 million gift from the actor
2019: received an honorary Doctor of Fine Arts degree from The University of South Carolina for her work in the Arts and Arts Education

References

External links

1948 births
20th-century American actresses
21st-century American actresses
Actresses from Houston
African-American actresses
20th-century African-American women singers
African-American television producers
Television producers from New York City
American women television producers
American film actresses
American soap opera actresses
American stage actresses
American television actresses
American voice actresses
Howard University alumni
Living people
Tony Award winners
Drama Desk Award winners
Television producers from Texas
American women film producers
Film producers from New York (state)
Film producers from Texas
21st-century African-American women
21st-century African-American people
African-American history of Westchester County, New York